Hugh Shrapnel (born Birmingham, England, 1947) is an English composer of contemporary classical music and oboist. He was a student of Cornelius Cardew and a member of the Scratch Orchestra. He also co-founded the Promenade Theatre Orchestra in 1969.

Discography

References

External links
Hugh Shrapnel page
Hugh Shrapnel personal website

20th-century classical composers
English experimental musicians
1947 births
British oboists
People from Birmingham, West Midlands
Living people
Male classical composers
20th-century English composers
20th-century British male musicians